The 10,000 metres speed skating event was part of the speed skating at the 1932 Winter Olympics programme. The competition was held on Friday, February 5, 1932, on Saturday, February 6, 1932, and on Monday, February 8, 1932. Eighteen speed skaters from six nations competed. Like all other speed skating events at this Olympics the competition was held for the only time in pack-style format, having all competitors skate at the same time.

Medalists

Records
These were the standing world and Olympic records (in minutes) prior to the 1932 Winter Olympics.

(*) The record was set in a high altitude venue (more than 1000 metres above sea level) and on naturally frozen ice.

In the later cancelled first heat Alexander Hurd skated 17:41.3 minutes. In the reskated heat he set a time of 17:56.2 minutes, but both in pack-style format.

Results

First round

Both heats were held on the afternoon of Friday, February 5, 1932.

Heat 1

After this heat a protest was lodged against two of the skaters (Alexander Hurd and Edwin Wedge) for not setting the pace for the agreed numbers of laps.

Heat 2

After this heat again a protest was lodged against a skater (Frank Stack) this time for interference on the home stretch.

After both heats the referee Joseph K. Savage from the United States referred the matter to the three technical delegates. Herbert J. Clarke from Great Britain, Walter Jakobsson from Finland, and Hermann Kleeberg from Germany decided at their meeting to have both heats reskated, and in fairness to all concerned all the original starters were allowed to compete the following morning.

Both reskated heats were held on the morning of Saturday, February 6, 1932.

Heat 1

Heat 2

Note that exactly the same eight skaters qualified in the reskated heats.

Final

References

External links
Official Olympic Report
 

Men's speed skating at the 1932 Winter Olympics